Asyndetus is a genus of flies in the family Dolichopodidae. There are more than 100 species described for the genus, distributed worldwide.

Species

Asyndetus aciliatus Grootaert & Meuffels, 2003
Asyndetus acuticornis (De Meijere, 1913)
Asyndetus albifacies Parent, 1929
Asyndetus albifrons Parent, 1929
Asyndetus albipalpus Loew, 1871
Asyndetus amaphinius Séguy, 1950
Asyndetus ammophilus Loew, 1869
Asyndetus anticus Negrobov, 1973
Asyndetus appendiculatus Loew, 1869
Asyndetus archboldi Robinson & Deyrup, 1997
Asyndetus aurocupreus Strobl, 1909
Asyndetus barbiventris Stackelberg, 1952
Asyndetus beijingensis Zhang & Yang, 2003
Asyndetus brevimanus Van Duzee, 1923
Asyndetus brunnicosus Becker, 1922
Asyndetus bursericola Bickel & Sinclair, 1997
Asyndetus bykovskyi Negrobov, Maslova & Selivanova, 2019
Asyndetus calcaratus Becker, 1922
Asyndetus carcinophilus Parent, 1937
Asyndetus caudatus Van Duzee, 1916
Asyndetus cavagnaroi Bickel & Sinclair, 1997
Asyndetus chaetifemoratus Parent, 1925
Asyndetus ciliatus Grootaert & Meuffels, 2003
Asyndetus clavipes Liu, Wang & Yang in Liu, Zhang, Wang & Yang, 2016
Asyndetus congensis Grichanov, 2013
Asyndetus connexus (Becker, 1902)
Asyndetus cornutus Van Duzee, 1916
Asyndetus crassipodus Harmston, 1968
Asyndetus crassitarsis Curran, 1926
Asyndetus currani Van Duzee, 1931
Asyndetus decaryi Parent, 1929
Asyndetus deficiens Robinson, 1975
Asyndetus diaphoriformis Negrobov & Shamshev, 1986
Asyndetus disjunctus Van Duzee, 1923
Asyndetus dominicensis Robinson, 1975
Asyndetus dubius Parent, 1925
Asyndetus eurytarsus Meuffels & Grootaert, 1993
Asyndetus exactus (Walker, 1859)
Asyndetus exiguus Van Duzee, 1927
Asyndetus exunguis Parent, 1927
Asyndetus fallahzadehi Grichanov in Grichanov & Rezaei, 2019
Asyndetus flavipalpus Van Duzee, 1932
Asyndetus flavitibialis Van Duzee, 1929
Asyndetus fractus De Meijere, 1913
Asyndetus fratellus Aldrich, 1896
Asyndetus geminus Becker, 1922
Asyndetus guangxiensis Zhang & Yang, 2003
Asyndetus harbeckii Van Duzee, 1914
Asyndetus hardyi Robinson, 1964
Asyndetus indifferens Curran, 1926
Asyndetus inermis Parent, 1927
Asyndetus infernus Bickel, 1996
Asyndetus intermedius Meuffels & Grootaert, 1993
Asyndetus interruptus (Loew, 1861)
Asyndetus johnsoni Van Duzee, 1916
Asyndetus latifrons (Loew, 1857)
Asyndetus latisurstylus Liu, Wang & Yang in Liu, Zhang, Wang & Yang, 2016
Asyndetus latitarsatus Becker, 1922
Asyndetus latus Van Duzee, 1916
Asyndetus lichtwardti Kertész, 1901
Asyndetus lii Wang & Yang, 2005
Asyndetus lineatus De Meijere, 1916
Asyndetus longicornis Negrobov, 1973
Asyndetus longipalpis Van Duzee, 1919
Asyndetus madagascarensis Grichanov, 2013
Asyndetus maelfaiti Bickel & Sinclair, 1997
Asyndetus melanopselaphus Stackelberg, 1952
Asyndetus mixtus Negrobov & Shamshev, 1986
Asyndetus mutatus Becker, 1922
Asyndetus mystacinus Bickel & Sinclair, 1997
Asyndetus namibiensis Grichanov, 2013
Asyndetus negrobovi Parvu, 1989
Asyndetus nevadensis Harmston, 1968
Asyndetus nigripes Van Duzee, 1916
Asyndetus obscurus Meuffels & Grootaert, 1993
Asyndetus occidentalis Van Duzee, 1919
Asyndetus oregonensis Harmston, 1966
Asyndetus parvicornis Van Duzee, 1932
Asyndetus perpulvillatus Parent, 1926
Asyndetus pogonops Robinson, 1975
Asyndetus porrectus Parent, 1939
Asyndetus pseudoseparatus Grichanov, 2013
Asyndetus savannensis Grichanov, 2013
Asyndetus scopifer Harmston, 1952
Asyndetus secundus Bickel, 1996
Asyndetus semarangensis Dyte, 1975
Asyndetus separatus (Becker, 1902)
Asyndetus severini Harmston & Knowlton, 1939
Asyndetus singularis Van Duzee, 1923
Asyndetus spinitarsis Harmston, 1951
Asyndetus spinosus Van Duzee, 1925
Asyndetus syntormoides Wheeler, 1899
Asyndetus terminalis Van Duzee, 1923
Asyndetus texanus Van Duzee, 1916
Asyndetus thaicus Grootaert & Meuffels, 2003
Asyndetus tibialis (Thomson, 1869)
Asyndetus transversalis Becker, 1907
Asyndetus tristis Parent, 1935
Asyndetus utahensis Harmston & Knowlton, 1942
Asyndetus varicolor Johnson, 1924
Asyndetus varus Loew, 1869
Asyndetus ventralis Wang, Yang & Masunaga, 2007
Asyndetus versicolor Johnson, 1924
Asyndetus vicinus Meuffels & Grootaert, 1993
Asyndetus virgatus Curran, 1926
Asyndetus wigginsi Bickel & Sinclair, 1997
Asyndetus wusuensis Wang & Yang, 2005
Asyndetus xinjiangensis Wang & Yang, 2005

The following species are considered synonyms of other species:
Asyndetus bredini Robinson, 1975: synonym of Asyndetus interruptus (Loew, 1861)
Asyndetus lateinterruptus Strobl, 1909: synonym of Asyndetus separatus (Becker, 1902)
Asyndetus nigripalpis (De Meijere, 1913): synonym of Asyndetus exactus (Walker, 1859)
Asyndetus ridiculus Parent, 1931: synonym of Asyndetus tibialis (Thomson, 1869)
Asyndetus wirthi Robinson, 1997: synonym of Asyndetus interruptus (Loew, 1861)

The following species were renamed:
Asyndetus tibialis De Meijere, 1916 (preoccupied by Asyndetus tibialis (Thomson, 1869)): renamed to Asyndetus semarangensis Dyte, 1975

The following species were moved to another genus:
Asyndetus izius Negrobov, 1973: moved to Cryptophleps
Asyndetus minutus Negrobov & Shamshev, 1986: moved to Cryptophleps
Asyndetus vividus Negrobov & Shamshev, 1986: moved to Cryptophleps

References 

Dolichopodidae genera
Diaphorinae
Taxa named by Hermann Loew